William Gilbert Land (born Doc Burrell Land, May 14, 1903 – April 14, 1986) was a Major League Baseball outfielder. He played one game for the Washington Senators, appearing as their starting center fielder in the last game of the  season, filling in for Sam West.

External links

1903 births
1986 deaths
Andalusia Reds players
Baseball players from Mississippi
Baton Rouge Red Sticks players
Clarksdale Ginners players
Dothan Boll Weevils players
El Dorado Lions players
Lindale Pepperells players
Major League Baseball outfielders
People from Kemper County, Mississippi
Washington Senators (1901–1960) players